Fenggang is a town under the jurisdiction of the prefecture-level city of Dongguan in Guangdong province, China.

Location
Fenggang is located southwest of Dongguan City and south of the towns of Tangxia and Qingxi. It borders Huizhou Huiyang District to the east and Shenzhen's Longgang District to the south. The total area of 82.5 square kilometers. The resident population of 31897 people in 2005, there are 300,000 floating residents.

Local residents 
Fenggang Town in 2004 has a resident population of eighteen thousand people. Hakka people make up three quarters of the total population, and the rest speak the Cantonese vernacular.

Economy 
Underwear manufacturer Cosmo Lady's head office is in Fengdeling Village, Fenggang.

References

External links
 Fenggang government website 

Geography of Dongguan
Towns in Guangdong